The HTC S520 (A.K.A. HTC Phoebus, HTC Juno) is a Windows Mobile based smartphone manufactured by High Tech Computer Corporation.  It is available in the US market as the T-Mobile Shadow and in Taiwan as the Dopod C750.  The T-Mobile version supports MyFaves.

Neo interface

T-Mobile, HTC, and Microsoft collaborated on the Neo interface introduced on the T-Mobile version.  The interface was designed to allow a more familiar cell phone user interface on a smartphone.

Shadow 2009
T-Mobile replaced the original Shadow model with a newer one in early 2009.  In addition to a design facelift and new colors, it supports Unlicensed Mobile Access through the T-Mobile @Home service.  It will also have Windows Mobile 6.1 Standard installed.

References

External links

 T-Mobile Shadow

Windows Mobile Standard devices
Phoebus